Edson Marshall Hemingway (May 8, 1893 – July 5, 1969) was a professional baseball player. He was a catcher over parts of three seasons (1914, 1917–18) with the St. Louis Browns, New York Giants and Philadelphia Phillies. For his career, he compiled a .225 batting average in 138 at-bats, with 13 runs batted in.

He was born in Sheridan, Michigan and died in Grand Rapids, Michigan at the age of 76.

External links

1893 births
1969 deaths
St. Louis Browns players
New York Giants (NL) players
Philadelphia Phillies players
Major League Baseball second basemen
Major League Baseball third basemen
Baseball players from Michigan
Nashville Vols players
Birmingham Barons players
Memphis Chickasaws players
Houston Buffaloes players
New Orleans Pelicans (baseball) players
Omaha Rourkes players
Sioux City Packers players
Sacramento Senators players
Vernon Tigers players
Los Angeles Angels (minor league) players
People from Montcalm County, Michigan